Torn is a text-based, crime-themed massively multiplayer online role-playing game. The game was developed by the British developer Joe Chedburn in 2003, and is one of the largest text-based online video games. The game involves a virtual world based around crime and business. It has an in-game currency, which can be obtained in many ways, like mugging, drug trafficking, and other crimes.

History
Torn was first launched in 2003. The game involves a virtual world based around gang violence and business. Like many role-playing games, players start at the bottom of the ladder and make their way to the top by earning experience points. The game focuses on crimes and player versus player combat as a way of earning EXP or experience points. However, the EXP system is different from other games, as it does not show how much EXP is left for the next level. Players can purchase in-game benefits in exchange for payments, which are termed "donations".  The Torn beta ended on 15 November 2004, with over a million users by 2008. A major overhaul of the Torn engine was completed in 2014, with Torn 'Respo' released on June 23 of that year. In 2018 Torn was made available as an Android App.

References

External links
 

2003 video games
Adventure games
Browser games
Video games developed in the United Kingdom